Gilbert Cesar Catibayan Remulla (born September 5, 1970) is a Filipino journalist and politician.

Biography
Gilbert is the seventh and youngest child of former Governor Juanito R. Remulla and Ditas Catibayan Remulla. His  brothers include current Cavite Governor Juanito Victor "Jonvic" Remulla and Justice Secretary Jesus Crispin "Boying" Remulla. Gilbert spent his childhood in Bel-Air, Makati and Imus, Cavite.

He spent his elementary years in the now defunct De La Salle University Grade School, high school at the Ateneo de Manila and went to the
University of the Philippines Diliman for his college education. He served as a National President of AIESEC, and was an active member of the Upsilon Sigma Phi fraternity.

Career
After obtaining a degree in Broadcast Communication in 1993, Remulla joined ABS-CBN as part of its news team. Remulla started as a production assistant, and then became a reporter and a regular in the morning and evening news.

In 1997, Gilbert took up his MA International Affairs with concentration in International Media and Communications at the Columbia University in New York City. His experience in the Ivy League school gave him the opportunity to work for CNN and the United Nations.

Gilbert successfully ran in the Congressional elections of May 2001 against his veteran rivals, joining fellow ABS-CBN co-anchor Ted Failon of Leyte. Being one of the youngest members of Congress of the Philippines, the time he has spent in office has been marked by comments about his relative youth in comparison to majority of the members of Congress. He was an author or co-author of the following laws - Republic Act 9165, or the Dangerous Drugs Act of 2002, and Republic Act 9287, or the Act Increasing the Penalty for the Illegal Numbers Game. He has also authored House Bill No. 185 seeking the abolition of the Sangguniang Kabataan and replacing it with a youth representative; House Bill No. 2452 which seeks to lower the cost of cellular phone usage and House Bill No. 5310 which aims at minimizing the use of plastic bags and plastic utensils that damage the environment. He ran again in 2004 and won, but lost his reelection bid for his third and final term in 2007 to then-Dasmariñas mayor Elpidio Barzaga Jr.

On January 23, 2008, former Senate President Ernesto Maceda, chairman emeritus of UNO announced that United Opposition spokesman Adel Tamano, former Cavite congressman Gilbert Remulla, incumbent Bukidnon congressman Teofisto Guingona III, incumbent Senators Jinggoy Estrada and Jamby Madrigal-Valade are the 2010 senatorial bets of the opposition and "vice presidential materials.”

He ran for senator under Nacionalista Party in the May 10, 2010 Senatorial election but lost. In 2013 he ran again for congressman, but this time in the 7th district due to his brother Boying is term limited and he ran for mayor of Tagaytay, under  the Nacionalista Party, Lakas-CMD and the United Nationalist Alliance. He lost to then-Tagaytay Mayor Bambol Tolentino of the Liberal party.

Personal life
In New York City, Remulla met Georgia Isabel Roa, whom he married in Catholic rites in 2000. They have three daughters, Roxanne Margarita, Rocio Isabel and Reanna.

References

External links
 
 The Opposite of Apathy blog

Living people
1970 births
Nacionalista Party politicians
Members of the House of Representatives of the Philippines from Cavite
Filipino reporters and correspondents
People from Imus
University of the Philippines Diliman alumni
ABS-CBN News and Current Affairs people